Chiam See Tong (born 12 March 1935) is a Singaporean retired politician and lawyer who served as the Secretary-General of Singapore Democratic Party between 1980 and 1993 and Secretary-General of Singapore People's Party between 2011 and 2019 and the chairman of Singapore Democratic Alliance between 2001 and 2011. He served as Member of Parliament (MP) for Potong Pasir SMC between 1984 and 2011. He was one of the two opposition MPs in Parliament.

A lawyer by profession, Chiam contested in the 1976 general election and 1979 by-elections as an independent candidate in Cairnhill SMC and Potong Pasir SMC but lost both. He founded the Singapore Democratic Party (SDP) in 1980 and became its secretary-general, and contested in the 1980 general election but was defeated again.  Chiam succeeded on his fourth attempt during the 1984 general election and won Potong Pasir SMC against People's Action Party candidate Mah Bow Tan. He joined J. B. Jeyaretnam from the Workers' Party as the second of only two opposition Members of Parliament.  He was the de facto Leader of the Opposition between 1986 and 1993.

Chiam left the SDP after a falling-out with his protégé Chee Soon Juan and joined the Singapore People's Party (SPP). In 2001, Chiam convinced three other opposition parties—National Solidarity Party, Pertubuhan Kebangsaan Melayu Singapura and Singapore Justice Party—to join the SPP in forming the Singapore Democratic Alliance (SDA), and served as SDA's chairman between 2001 and 2011.  He was the de facto Leader of the Opposition between 1997 and 2006. He withdrew the SPP from the SDA in the lead up to the 2011 general election and decided not to seek re-election for Potong Pasir SMC to contest in Bishan–Toa Payoh GRC, but lost to the PAP team.

Chiam retired after 39 years in politics at the age of 80 prior to the 2015 general election, citing health reasons. He was the longest-serving opposition MP until surpassed by Low Thia Kiang in 2018. He remains the longest-serving de facto Leader of the Opposition.

Early life and career
Chiam was educated at Anglo-Chinese School, where he was a competitive swimmer who enjoyed swimming 200 metres freestyle and was part of the ACS relay team of star swimmers. He completed his A Level examinations in 1955 before going on to the Victoria University of Wellington and graduated in 1961 with a Bachelor of Science degree. 

After graduation, he worked as a teacher at Mahmud Secondary School in Raub, Pahang between 1962 and 1963, and later at Cedar Girls' Secondary School in Singapore between 1964 and 1972. During this time, he underwent training at the Teachers' Training College and obtained a Certificate in Education in 1967.

Chiam decided to have a change of career so he read law at the Inner Temple and qualified as a barrister-at-law in 1974. When he returned to Singapore, he was called to the bar as an advocate and solicitor. He worked at Philip Wong & Co between 1974 and 1976 before leaving to set up his own law firm, Chiam & Co, in 1976. He closed Chiam & Co in 2002 to serve as a full-time Member of Parliament.

Political career
Chiam first entered politics in the 1976 general election when he contested as an independent candidate in Cairnhill SMC against Lim Kim San, a candidate from the governing People's Action Party (PAP) who had been a Cabinet minister since 1965. He lost after garnering 31.83% of the vote against Lim's 68.17%.

During the 1979 by-elections, Chiam contested in Potong Pasir SMC as an independent candidate against Howe Yoon Chong, then a new PAP candidate. However, he lost to Howe after garnering 33.15% of the vote against Howe's 66.85%.

Singapore Democratic Party
Chiam founded the Singapore Democratic Party (SDP) on 6 August 1980, ahead of the 1980 general election which will held on 23 December 1980, and served as the party's secretary-general. He contested in the 1980 general election as a SDP candidate in Potong Pasir SMC, but lost to Howe Yoon Chong again with 40.95% of the vote against Howe's 59.05%.

Lawsuits against Howe and Dhanabalan
In 1981, Chiam sued Minister for Defence Howe Yoon Chong and Minister for Foreign Affairs S. Dhanabalan for slandering him during the speeches they made in 1980. Howe had called Chiam a "twice unsuccessful lawyer" and "a lawyer who is not even very good at law", while Dhanabalan had called Chiam "a two-bit lawyer orchestrating a three-piece band whose members only appear once every four or five years". J. B. Jeyaretnam, a lawyer who was also a Member of Parliament (MP) from the opposition Workers' Party (WP), represented Chiam in filing a writ in the High Court seeking damages from Howe and Dhanabalan.

Dhanabalan eventually publicly apologised to Chiam, while Howe publicly withdrew his imputations against Chiam's professional capacity and competence and offered compensation. Chiam accepted their apologies and withdrew the lawsuits against them.

Member of Parliament
During the 1984 general election, Chiam contested as an SDP candidate in Potong Pasir SMC again, this time against a new PAP candidate Mah Bow Tan. In the lead-up to the election, Prime Minister Lee Kuan Yew compared Chiam and Mah's O Level results in a rally speech: "Mah Bow Tan, age 16, took his 'O' Levels—six distinctions, two credits. Mr Chiam, age 18—six credits, one pass." The Prime Minister's Office (PMO) later conveyed an apology from Lee for making an error about Chiam's results; Chiam had actually gotten seven credits. Chiam eventually won the election with 60.28% of the vote against Mah's 39.72%, and was elected as the Member of Parliament (MP) representing Potong Pasir SMC. He retained his parliamentary seat in Potong Pasir SMC following the 1988 and 1991 general elections after garnering 63.13% and 69.64% of the vote in those two elections against PAP candidates Kenneth Chen and Andy Gan respectively.

When Chiam was first elected into Parliament in 1984, he was only one of two opposition Members of Parliament, the other being J. B. Jeyaretnam, the Workers' Party secretary-general. After Jeyaretnam lost his parliamentary seat in 1986, Chiam remained the sole elected opposition Member of Parliament until after the 1991 general election, which saw three other opposition politicians becoming elected Members of Parliament: Ling How Doong and Cheo Chai Chen of the SDP, and Low Thia Khiang of the Workers' Party. Chiam was the de facto Leader of the Opposition. At the time of the 1991 general election, the SDP had its best electoral results—having all nine candidates polled in the top 10, scoring 48.6% of the party's popular vote, including Chiam's personal best electoral result at 69.64%.

Leaving the SDP
In 1992, Chiam recruited Chee Soon Juan, a psychology lecturer at the National University of Singapore, to join a four-member SDP team to contest in Marine Parade GRC in the 1992 by-elections. Although the SDP team lost after garnering just 24.5% against a four-member PAP team led by Prime Minister Goh Chok Tong, Chee's candidacy had generated considerable public interest as it was the first time that an academic from a state-run university had stood for election against the PAP. Chee subsequently became the assistant secretary-general of the SDP and Chiam's protégé.

In 1992, PAP Member of Parliament Choo Wee Khiang said in a speech that when he drove to Little India one evening, he found it "pitch dark, not because there was no light, but because there were too many Indians around." Chiam was the only Member of Parliament who called out Choo for his remarks.

In 1993, after Chiam had a conflict with Chee Soon Juan and other SDP leaders, he was expelled from the SDP and had to give up his parliamentary seat under Singapore's electoral rules since he was no longer a party member he had contested under. However, Chiam filed a lawsuit against the SDP and won the case. The court reversed his expulsion, thus allowing him to retain his parliamentary seat until the next general election.

In 1995, Chiam sided with the Singapore Government's refusal to delay the execution of Filipino domestic worker Flor Contemplacion for murder despite appeals from Philippine President Fidel V. Ramos. After the incident caused Philippines–Singapore relations to be strained, Chiam made a speech in Parliament, speaking up for Singapore and stating that he would not allow the foreign press to use the opposition as a club to hit at the Singapore Government.

Singapore People's Party

Chiam left the SDP in December 1996 and joined the Singapore People's Party (SPP), which was founded by a SDP faction of pro-Chiam supporters in 1994, becoming the secretary-general of the SPP. Under the SPP banner, he contested in Potong Pasir SMC again during the 1997 general election and won with 55.15% of the vote against the PAP candidate Andy Gan.

Singapore Democratic Alliance
Ahead of the 2001 general election, the SPP joined forces with three other opposition parties—National Solidarity Party (NSP), Pertubuhan Kebangsaan Melayu Singapura (PKMS) and Singapore Justice Party (SJP)—to form the Singapore Democratic Alliance (SDA), with Chiam as the SDA's chairman. Chiam then contested in the general election under the SDA banner in Potong Pasir SMC and won with 52.43% of the vote against the PAP candidate Sitoh Yih Pin, thus continuing for a fifth term in Parliament as the Member of Parliament for Potong Pasir SMC. He closed his law firm, Chiam & Co, in the following year to become a full-time Member of Parliament.

Chiam was elected to Parliament for a sixth term after winning the 2006 general election with 55.82% of the vote against Sitoh Yih Pin again. Chiam's victory was a surprise, especially since the PAP had offered a S$80 million upgrading package for Potong Pasir residents and had brought in former Prime Minister Goh Chok Tong to assist in the PAP campaign in the constituency.

In early 2008, Chiam suffered a mild stroke which led to the suspension of his regular Meet-the-People Sessions (MPS). Although he recovered, Chiam said in 2011 that there were still remnants of the stroke he had suffered.

In 2009, Chiam celebrated his 25th year as the Member of Parliament for Potong Pasir SMC. That year, he also announced that he did not plan to contest in Potong Pasir SMC in the next general election, and would instead contest in a Group Representation Constituency (GRC).

In 2010, Chiam tried to bring the Reform Party into the SDA. He reportedly accepted the conditions the Reform Party set out for joining the SDA, but the other members of the SDA Council opposed the terms of entry and blocked the move. In 2010 and early 2011, it was reported the some SDA Council members felt that Chiam was unable to fulfil his role as the chairman of the party after he had cut back his political activities following his stroke in 2008. On 28 February 2011, the SDA Council voted to relieve Chiam of his role as chairman, but stressed that they still hoped to field him as a candidate in the next general election. On 2 March 2011, however, Chiam announced that the SPP was withdrawing from the SDA, and that he would contest under the SPP banner in the next general election.

2011 general election
Between 1997 and 2011, Low Thia Kiang and Chiam were the only elected opposition Members of Parliament (MP) in Parliament.

During the 2011 general election, Low and Chiam left their respective strongholds in Hougang and Potong Pasir SMC to challenge the ruling PAP in Group Representation Constituencies (GRCs). Low would challenge the ruling PAP in Aljunied GRC, while Chiam would contest the Bishan–Toa Payoh GRC. In so doing, Low and Chiam risked a situation where there would be no elected opposition MPs in Parliament had they lost. 

Chiam and the SPP team ultimately lost with 43.07% of the vote against the PAP team's 56.93%. Chiam's wife, Lina Loh, contested under the SPP banner in Potong Pasir SMC but lost to the PAP candidate Sitoh Yih Pin by a narrow margin of 114 votes (0.72%), garnering 49.64% of the vote against Sitoh's 50.36%. However, Low's gambit paid off as he led the Workers' Party to a historic breakthrough in the election, with a victory in Aljunied GRC. The win marked the first time that an opposition party won a GRC. Also, Loh was qualified for a parliamentary seat as a Non-Constituency Member of Parliament in the 12th Parliament and she accepted it on 12 May 2011.

Retirement from politics
On 30 August 2015, Chiam announced that he would not be running for election in the 2015 general election due to his declining health. In the general election that year, the SPP contested in three SMCs and one GRC but lost to the PAP in all four. Lina Loh also lost to Sitoh Yih Pin again in Potong Pasir SMC with 33.61% of the vote against Sitoh's 66.39%.

On 4 September 2019, the SPP announced that Chiam would be stepping down from his position as the party's secretary-general post due to his declining health. Chiam stepped down on 16 October 2019 and was succeeded by Steve Chia.

Post-retirement
On 9 March 2017, Chiam and Lina Loh launched the Chiam See Tong Sports Fund at the Old Parliament House to help needy athletes achieve their sporting dreams. Chiam and Loh are co-patrons of the organisation, which is chaired by their daughter, Camilla Chiam.

Personal life
Chiam's name, "See Tong", which means "punctual" or "timely", was given to him by his grandfather, Chiam Seng Poh, who was a revolutionary involved in the uprisings in the final years of the Qing dynasty before the 1911 Revolution. Chiam Seng Poh had fled China with his family after one of those failed uprisings and settled in Muar, Malaya. Chiam's maternal grandfather, Lim Liang Quee, was part of the Straits Chinese elite. Mabel Lim, one of Chiam's maternal aunts, married Kwa Soon Siew, a brother-in-law of Singapore's first prime minister Lee Kuan Yew.

Chiam's father, Chiam Heng Hong, was a businessman who dealt in commodities like rubber, pepper and sugar. Chiam's mother, Lily Lim, was a founder of the 7th Singapore Company of the Girls' Brigade at Prinsep Street Presbyterian Church in the 1950s. Chiam Heng Hong and Lily Lim had two sons, Chiam See Tong and Chiam Joon Tong.

Chiam met his wife, Lina Loh, in London in 1973. They married in Singapore in 1975 when Chiam was 40 and Loh was 26, and have a daughter, Camilla.

See also
 List of Singapore opposition party MPs elected

References

Bibliography

External links
Profile at Parliament of Singapore website
The Straits Times (print edition), 12 December 2009, pp. A38, A39.

1935 births
Living people
Members of the Parliament of Singapore
Singapore People's Party politicians
Singapore Democratic Party politicians
Independent politicians in Singapore
20th-century Singaporean lawyers
Anglo-Chinese School alumni
Singaporean people of Teochew descent
Singaporean Presbyterians
Victoria University of Wellington alumni
Political party founders
Members of the Inner Temple